Georges Pabos McNaughton (April 4, 1897 – February 6, 1991) was a Canadian ice hockey player. An amateur player, he spent the predominant bulk of his career in the Quebec City Hockey League with the Quebec Sons of Ireland team. He was born in Gaspé, Quebec.

Career statistics

Regular season and playoffs

External links

1897 births
1991 deaths
Anglophone Quebec people
Canadian ice hockey right wingers
Ice hockey people from Quebec
People from Gaspésie–Îles-de-la-Madeleine
Winnipeg Victorias players